|}

The Prestige Novices' Hurdle is a Grade 2 National Hunt hurdle race in Great Britain which is open to horses aged four years or older. It is run at Haydock Park over a distance of about 2 miles and 7 furlongs (2 miles, 6 furlongs and 177 yards, or ), and during its running there are twelve hurdles to be jumped. The race is for novice hurdlers, and it is scheduled to take place each year in February.

The event was transferred to its present venue in 2001, having been held previously at Chepstow since 1992.
Prior to 1991 the race was held at Newbury since its inception, as the Philip Cornes Saddle of Gold Stayers' Novices' Hurdle Final, in 1977. 

Its distance at Haydock was initially 2 miles and 7½ furlongs. In 2008 the distance was extended to 3 miles and another furlong was added for the races in 2009 and 2010, but the distance reverted to 3 miles again in 2011. The present distance was introduced in 2012. The race is now sponsored by the vegetable growing company Albert Bartlett.

Winners since 1997

See also
 Horseracing in Great Britain
 List of British National Hunt races

References
 Racing Post:

 pedigreequery.com – Prestige Novices' Hurdle – Haydock.

National Hunt races in Great Britain
Haydock Park Racecourse
National Hunt hurdle races
Recurring sporting events established in 1977